= Ronald Roth =

American orthodontist

Ronald H. Roth (1933 – January 24, 2005) was an American orthodontist who is known for his contributions to orthodontic field. Roth introduced his "Roth Prescription" in 1975 for straight-wire brackets and is also known for his philosophy, which includes the correction of malocclusion in harmony with the functional occlusion.

== Career ==
Roth received his orthodontic degree from Loyola University Chicago School of Dentistry. Roth was known to work well with Dr. Lawrence Andrews. He initially met Dr. Andrews in 1968. During his work, Dr. Andrews gave Roth two sets of his Andrews Straight Wire Brackets for evaluation. Roth believed that as long as the condyles and mandible were positioned correctly in centric relation, Andrew's six keys to occlusion was compatible for orthodontic treatment. Dr. Andrews had come up with "Andrews Prescription" for the straight-wire brackets he developed. This meant that the orthodontic brackets had pre-adjusted tip and torque built into the brackets.

== Roth Prescription ==
Roth believed that some degree of over-correction must be introduced into the brackets. Therefore, Roth introduced "Roth Prescription" to the field of orthodontics in 1975.

Roth's treatment philosophy involved a clinician to make diagnosis through these 5 areas of concern: facial esthetics, dental esthetics, functional occlusion and condylar position, elements needed for stability and periodontal health. With this treatment approach, Roth along with Dr. Williams started the Roth Williams International Society of Orthodontists.

He died due to cancer in 2005.
